Estévez, or Estevez in English, is a Galician (Spanish) family name. It is a patronymic, meaning son of Stephen, in Galician Estevo. In Portuguese the equivalent is Esteves, the Italian equivalent is Di Stefano and Stefani and the Spanish equivalent is  Estébanez, from the Spanish name Esteban.

The name may refer to:

People

Estevez acting family

A family of American actors.

Other people 
 Antonio Estévez (1916–1988), Venezuelan composer
 Don Francisco Estévez source of name for Estevez Palace, since 1880 office of the President of Uruguay.
 Camilo Estévez (born 1999), Spanish bishop of the Palmarian Catholic Church
 Carlos Estévez (baseball) (born 1992), Dominican baseball player
 Carmen Fraga Estévez (born 1948), Spanish politician and Member of the European Parliament
 Emilio Estevez Tsai (born 1998), Canadian soccer player
 Felipe de Jesús Estévez (born 1946), American Roman Catholic bishop
 Gabriela Estévez (born 1978), Argentine politician
 Horacio Estevez (1940–1996), Venezuelan sprinter
 João Rodrigues Esteves (1700-1751), Portuguese composer
 Joaquín Estévez (born 1984), Argentinian professional golfer
  (1923-2011), military personnel spy from Melilla
 Jorge Medina Estévez (1926-2021), Chilean bishop and cardinal
 Luis Estevez (1930–2014), Cuban-born American fashion designer and costume designer
 Maximiliano Estévez (born 1977), Argentine footballer
 Reyes Estévez (born 1976), Spanish European championship runner
 Roberto Estévez (1957-1982), Argentine soldier, awarded posthumously with the Argentine Nation to the Heroic Valour in Combat Cross
 Scarlett Estevez (born 2007), American actress

Fictional characters 
 Dano Estevez, character from the film Final Destination 2
 Sheen Estevez, character from the CGI television series and film The Adventures of Jimmy Neutron: Boy Genius

Galician-language surnames
Spanish-language surnames
Patronymic surnames
Surnames from given names